Clinopodium fasciculatum is a species of flowering plant in the family Lamiaceae. It is found only in Ecuador. Its natural habitats are subtropical or tropical moist montane forests and subtropical or tropical high-altitude shrubland.

References

fasciculatum
Flora of Ecuador
Least concern plants
Taxonomy articles created by Polbot